Burfat (Urdu: برفات) is the name of a Baloch tribe in Balochistan and Sindh provinces of Pakistan.

References 

Ethnic groups in Pakistan
Baloch tribes